Yehuda Goor (31 December 1862 – 21 January 1950), born Yehuda Leib Grozovski was a Russian-born Israeli linguist, educator, writer, and translator. He received the Bialik Prize for Jewish Thought in 1946.

Biography
Yehuda Grozovski was born in Pogost, Minsk Governorate, in 1862. After having attended the Volozhin yeshiva, Grozovski studied pedagogics in the Institute for Hebrew Teachers at Vilna. At age 27, he emigrated to Palestine, teaching Hebrew in various places; in 1896, he received an appointment as a teacher of Hebrew in the agricultural school of Jaffa. Three years later, he moved to Mikveh Israel, and filled the same office there. 

He moved to Beirut in 1906, where he worked for the Anglo-Palestine Bank. He returned to Jaffa in 1911 to become the manager of the bank's branch there. He retained this position until 1929.

References

 

1862 births
1950 deaths
English–Hebrew translators
Translators to Hebrew
Burials at Trumpeldor Cemetery